Elections to High Peak Borough Council in Derbyshire, England were held in 1976. All of the council was up for election and the control of the council changed from no overall control to Conservative control.

After the election, the composition of the council was:
Conservative 27
Labour 8
Liberal 2
Independent 9

Election result

Ward results

References

1976
High Peak
1970s in Derbyshire